Petra Letang (born 4 May 1979 in Plaistow, London, England) is a British actress, probably best known for her role as Naomi Julien in  the BBC soap opera EastEnders and  Adele Effanga in Holby City.

Biography
Letang grew up in east London, and attended the Anna Scher Theatre school in Islington, London. She has played Donna Lewis in the Channel 5 soap Family Affairs in 1999, and the character Pauline in the BBC2 drama Babyfather in 2002. Other television credits have included Jonathan Creek (2004), The Bill (2005) and The Last Detective (2005). She also appeared in the British film Wondrous Oblivion in 2003.

In 2005, Letang was cast as Naomi Julien — the lesbian lover of Sonia Fowler (Natalie Cassidy) — in BBC's EastEnders. She left the role in 2007, reportedly because scriptwriters had "run out of ideas for her". Prior to this, Letang had gone public with her fears that her character would be axed following a "bad public reaction" to the lesbian storyline that saw Naomi break up the marriage of Sonia and Martin Fowler (James Alexandrou).

Letang went on to join the cast of Angie Le Mar's successful play, Funny Black Women On the Edge. It played at the Hackney Empire, East London, in the spring of 2007.

In March 2007, Letang was one of several television stars who took part in Searchlight magazine's "Hope Not Hate bus" campaign with the Daily Mirror, which was aimed at spreading a message of goodwill in the build-up to the local elections in May 2007. Letang commented: "This campaign is very close to my heart. We have to make a difference for the young people coming up."

Letang starred in Jason Barrett's film The Naked Poet in 2011, in which she played the lead female role Simone and gave what was described as a "stand out performance". She was also credited as both producer and one of the executive producers.

In 2013, Letang was cast in Holby City as healthcare assistant Adele Effanga. She is introduced as the sister of Mo Effanga (Chizzy Akudolu) and made her first appearance in January 2014.

Filmography

Film

Television

References

External links

English television actresses
English soap opera actresses
1979 births
Living people
English people of Dominica descent
Black British actresses
Alumni of the Anna Scher Theatre School
English film actresses
English stage actresses
20th-century English actresses
21st-century English actresses